The 1914 Portland Beavers season was the 12th season in the history of the Portland Beavers baseball team. Under the leadership of manager Walt McCredie, the team compiled a 113–84 record and won the Pacific Coast League (PCL) pennant. The Beavers won five PCL pennants between 1906 and 1914. 

Second baseman Bill Rodgers was the team captain and led the team with 227 hits. Outfielder Ty Lober led the PCL with nine home runs, and shortstop Art Kores led the league with 54 doubles and 21 triples.

1914 PCL standings

Statistics

Batting 
Note: Pos = Position; G = Games played; AB = At bats; H = Hits; Avg. = Batting average; HR = Home runs; SLG = Slugging percentage; SB = Stolen bases

Pitching 
Note: G = Games pitched; IP = Innings pitched; W = Wins; L = Losses; PCT = Win percentage; ERA = Earned run average; SO = Strikeouts

References

1914 in sports in Oregon
Pacific Coast League seasons
1914 in Portland, Oregon